The 1997 McDonald's Championship took place at Palais Omnisports de Paris-Bercy in Paris, France.

Summary
The teams that took part in the 8th edition of the tournament were the Chicago Bulls, Paris Basket Racing (France), Olympiacos Piraeus (Greece), Atenas de Cordoba (Argentina), Benetton Treviso (Italy) and FC Barcelona Banca Catalana (Spain). The 1996 & 1998 NBA champions, the Chicago Bulls won it beating Olympiacos in the final at the Palais Omnisport de Paris-Bercy, in Paris.Surprisingly, both the Italian and Spanish champions, traditional European powerhouses Benetton and FC Barcelona, lost their preliminary stage games and were forced to battle for 5th place. The Chicago Bulls instead led by Michael Jordan, and without Scottie Pippen managed to win their semifinal game against the hosts PSG Racing coached by Božidar Maljković, by 89-82. In the final game Chicago Bulls faced European champions Olympiacos Piraeus. The Greek side coached by legendary Serbian coach Dušan Ivković proved stronger than PSG Racing, but the Bulls pulled the best of their abilities and cruised to an easy 104-78 win.

Participants

Bracket

Final

Chicago Bulls
 Michael Jordan 27, Randy Brown 12, Steve Kerr 10, Luc Longley 9, Bill Wennington 8, Toni Kukoč 5, Boris Gorenc 7, Jason Caffey 6, Ron Harper 6, Jud Buechler 6, Scott Burrell 4, Joe Kleine 2, Keith Booth 2, Dante Calabria, Rusty LaRue. Coach: Phil Jackson

Olympiacos
 Artūras Karnišovas 19, Franko Nakić 16, Dragan Tarlać 14, Michael Hawkins 12, Dimitris Karaplis 6, Johnny Rogers 4, Milan Tomić 3, Aleksey Savrasenko 2, Nikos Michalos 2, Dušan Vukčević, Efthimis Bakatsias, Anatoly Zourpenko, Nikos Pettas. Coach: Dušan Ivković

Final standings

Sources
1997 edition

External links
raisport.rai.it
NBA International Pre-Season and Regular-Season Games
List of champions at a-d-c

1997–98
1997–98 in American basketball
1997–98 in Greek basketball
1997–98 in Spanish basketball
1997–98 in French basketball
1997–98 in Italian basketball
1997–98 in Argentine basketball
International basketball competitions hosted by France